Julien Duvivier (8 October 1896 – 29 October 1967) was a French film director and screenwriter. He was prominent in French cinema in the years 1930–1960. Amongst his most original films, chiefly notable are La Bandera, Pépé le Moko, Little World of Don Camillo, Panic (Panique), Voici le temps des assassins and Marianne de ma jeunesse.

Jean Renoir called him, a "great technician, [a] rigorist, a poet".

Early years
It was as an actor, in 1916 at the Théâtre de l'Odéon under the direction of André Antoine, that Duvivier's career began. In 1918 he moved on to Gaumont, as a writer and assistant of, amongst others, André Antoine, Louis Feuillade and Marcel L'Herbier. In 1919 he directed his first film. In the 1920s several of his films had a religious concern: Credo ou la tragédie de Lourdes, L'abbé Constantin and La Vie miraculeuse de Thérèse Martin — a film about the Carmelite saint Thérèse of Lisieux.

The 1930s
In the 1930s Duvivier was part of the production company, 'Film d'Art', founded by Marcel Vandal and Charles Delac and he worked as part of a team. He stayed with them for nine years. David Golder (1930), was his first success. It was also his first 'talkie', as it was of the actor Harry Baur. They worked together many more times in the 1930s. In 1934 Duvivier collaborated with Jean Gabin for the first time in the film Maria Chapdelaine, while for La Bandera (1935), he availed himself of the writing talent of Charles Spaak, who had previously worked with Jacques Feyder, Jean Grémillon, Marc Allégret and Marcel L'Herbier. They too would work together many times from this point onwards. Having made Le Golem (1936), a remake of an earlier German horror film, Duvivier set out on La belle équipe (also 1936), with Jean Gabin, Charles Vanel and Raymond Aimos. The film remains a significant example of his work. Five unemployed men hit the lottery jackpot and decide to buy a seaside café/dance hall together. The unexpected, however, keeps happening. Once jealousy over a woman, Gina, (Viviane Romance), gets mixed up with the venture, there is little left to save. The original ending of the film involving a killing, was judged too pessimistic, and another, happier ending, was filmed. It was the happier version that was released, though both versions still survive. L'Homme du jour (1936), with Maurice Chevalier in the lead role is a minor work in the director's canon but Pépé le Moko and Un Carnet de Bal (both 1937) are incontestable summits.

Pépé le Moko, which plunges into the midst of the gangster underworld and which had the Casbah (Arab quarter) of Algiers for exotic backdrop, was the film which propelled Jean Gabin into the category of an international star. In 1938 Duvivier signed a contract with MGM and made his first American film, a biopic of Johann Strauss, The Great Waltz. The next year, back in France, he made La Fin du jour, in which theatre actors in retirement struggle to see that their retirement home remains open. Michel Simon played an old ham actor, and Louis Jouvet, an old leading actor who still believes in his seductive powers. La Charrette fantôme followed, a horror film adapted from a novel by Selma Lagerlöf. In 1940 Untel père et fils, a family history starring Raimu, Michèle Morgan, and Louis Jouvet, was not able to be shown — because of the political situation — until the end of the war, at least in France. It is generally considered a minor work, and even a failure.

World War II, his American period
During World War II, Duvivier left to work in the United States. Before leaving the continent, he spent some days in Portugal. He stayed in Estoril, at the Hotel Palácio, between 2 July and 6 July 1940.
After arriving in the United States, he produced several movies. Lydia (1941); two anthology films, Tales of Manhattan (1942) with Charles Boyer and Rita Hayworth among leading actors, and Flesh and Fantasy (1943) with Edward G. Robinson, Charles Boyer and Barbara Stanwyck; The Impostor (1944), again with Jean Gabin; and Destiny (also 1944), a Reginald Le Borg directed film which was built around a cut thirty-minute sequence from Flesh and Fantasy (Duvivier was uncredited) .

After the war

On his return to France, Duvivier experienced some difficulties in resuming his career. Panic (Panique) (1946), an exhaustive summary of the lowest of human instincts, was the most personal, darkest, and nihilistic of his works. It was a bitter failure with critics and the public. Duvivier continued, notwithstanding, to work in France until the end of his life, apart from a short period in Great Britain to shoot Anna Karenina (1948) and to Spain for Black Jack (1950).

Under the Sky of Paris (1951) is a highly original film from the point of view of the way the film was cut. In the course of a day in Paris, one follows people whose paths will cross. The same year Duvivier shot the first of the humorous Don Camillo films from the Giovanni Guareschi books, Le Petit monde de Don Camillo. It met with immediate popular success and he followed its success with The Return of Don Camillo (1953). The series continued with other directors.

In Voici le temps des assassins (1956), Jean Gabin plays a decent restaurateur in Les Halles who is swindled by a cynical young woman, Catherine, (Danièle Delorme). Duvivier co-wrote and directed two films in 1957: the drama Lovers of Paris (starring Gérard Philipe) and the comedy-thriller The Man in the Raincoat (starring Fernandel and Bernard Blier).

Marie-Octobre (1959) followed, featuring Danielle Darrieux, Serge Reggiani, and Bernard Blier amongst others. It was an exercise in style; 11 people, nine men, two women, and a mise en scène that followed the unities of time, place, and action, it had a constant concern for the framing of the composition to reinforce an inquisitorial, menacing atmosphere. The same year he was invited to be part of the jury of the Cannes Film Festival, 1959, the year the Nouvelle Vague fully emerged. Duvivier's final portmanteau film was Le Diable et les dix Commandements (1962), while the  scenario of Chair de poule (1963) has a resemblance to The Postman Always Rings Twice and again features an unscrupulous woman.

During the fall of 1967, just as the production of Diaboliquement vôtre reached completion, a film about a man made amnesiac following a car accident, Duvivier was in a traffic accident, triggering a heart attack which killed him. He was 71; he left behind a filmography comprising nearly 70 films. He is buried in the cemetery of Rueil-Malmaison in the Hauts-de-Seine.

Filmography

References

External links

1896 births
1967 deaths
French film directors
French-language film directors
German-language film directors
French male screenwriters
Mass media people from Lille
20th-century French screenwriters
20th-century French male writers